Mačevo is a village in the Berovo Municipality of North Macedonia.

Demographics
According to the 2002 census, the village had a total of 206 inhabitants. Ethnic groups in the village include:

Macedonians 206

Notable people
Metodi Stamboliski, Macedonian general and Chief of General Staff of the Army of the Republic of Macedonia.

References

External links
Visit Macedonia

Villages in Berovo Municipality